The  russet-backed jungle flycatcher have been split into two species:
 Flores jungle flycatcher, Cyornis oscillans
 Sumba jungle flycatcher, Cyornis stresemanni

References 

Birds by common name